Edmund Blair Leighton  (21 September 18521 September 1922) was an English painter of historical genre scenes, specialising in Regency and medieval subjects. His art is associated with the pre-Raphaelite movement of the mid-to-late nineteenth and early twentieth centuries.

Biography
Leighton was the son of the artist Charles Blair Leighton (1823–1855) and Caroline Leighton (née Boosey). He was educated at University College School, leaving at 15 to work for a tea merchant. Wishing to study art, he went to evening classes in South Kensington and then to Heatherley's School in Newman Street, London. Aged 21, he entered the Royal Academy Schools. Among his first commissions were monochrome illustrations for Cassell's Magazine and its Book of British Ballads. His first painting to be exhibited at the Royal Academy was A Flaw in the Title in 1874; it sold for £200. He soon gave up "black and white" illustrations, working for the rest of his career in oil on canvas. He married Katherine Nash in 1885; they had a son, the painter E. J. Blair Leighton, and a daughter. He exhibited annually at the Royal Academy until 1920.

Leighton was a fastidious craftsman, producing highly finished, decorative historical paintings. These were romanticised scenes, often of chivalry and women in medieval dress with a popular appeal. It would appear that he left no diaries, and though he exhibited at the Royal Academy for over forty years, he was never an Academician or an Associate.

Works
                      

                      

Among Leighton's other works are:

                      

 Un Gage d'Amour (1881), Auckland Art Gallery Toi o Tamaki.
 Conquest (1884)
 The Rehearsal (1888), Croydon Clocktower, UK.
How Liza Loved the King (1890), Towneley Hall Art Gallery and Museum, Burnley.
 Waiting for the Coach (1895), Manchester Art Gallery.
On the Threshold (1900), Manchester Art Gallery.
The Accolade (1901), private collection.
Adieu (1901), Manchester Art Gallery.
The Shadow (1909), City Hall, Cardiff
A Nibble (1914), private collection.
An Arrival (1916), City Hall, Cardiff
The Lord of Burleigh, Tennyson (1919), private collection.
Sweet Solitude (1919), private collection.
After Service (1921), private collection.
Signing the Register (undated), Bristol City Museum and Art Gallery.
The Fond Farewell (1891), Messum's, London.
Lord of the Manor (undated), private collection.
Sorrow and Song (undated), Bristol City Museum and Art Gallery.

References

Bibliography

External links

1852 births
1922 deaths
19th-century English painters
English male painters
20th-century English painters
British genre painters
People educated at University College School
Alumni of the Heatherley School of Fine Art
Alumni of the Royal Academy Schools
19th-century English male artists
English children's book illustrators
Members of the Royal Institute of Oil Painters
20th-century English male artists